The 2000–01 Iowa Hawkeyes men's basketball team represented the University of Iowa as members of the Big Ten Conference. The team was led by second-year head coach Steve Alford and played their home games at Carver-Hawkeye Arena. They finished the season 23–12 overall and 7–9 in Big Ten play. The Hawkeyes won the Big Ten tournament to receive an automatic bid to the NCAA tournament as #7 seed in the East Region. After defeating Creighton, the Hawkeyes fell to the Kentucky Wildcats in the second round.

Roster

Schedule

|-
!colspan=9 style=| Regular season
|-

|-
!colspan=9 style=|Big Ten tournament

|-
!colspan=9 style=|NCAA tournament

Source: Schedule

Rankings

References

Iowa Hawkeyes
Iowa Hawkeyes men's basketball seasons
Iowa
Hawk
Hawk
Big Ten men's basketball tournament championship seasons